Cabriana Sea Skiffs is a boutique maker of custom sea skiffs built out of fiberglass and teak. It is located in Foley, Alabama.

History
The company was founded in 1996 by Lynn Rabren. The "boutique Gulf Coast boatbuilder" was relaunched under new ownership in 2019.  Caribiana sea skiffs are outfitted to each customers wishes with mahogany or teak wood finishes.  Having been described as having “graceful” hull shaping and “classic” wood detailing, the ease and maneuvering Of this lightweight boat with a shallow draft make it popular with boaters because it can go where similarly sized boats cannot.

Production
Caribiana's sea skiffs are produced in small quantities (about 20 boats a year in 2019 and only about 110 are in existence) and outfitted for "serious" as well as recreational fishing. The boats, costing between $55,000 and $75,000 in 2019.  This boat and design has a fascinating local history and won a Garden & Gun magazine award for best of Made in the South in 2010.

References

External links
 Company website

Manufacturing companies based in Florida
American boat builders
Companies established in 1996
Companies based in Pensacola, Florida